Suchy Dąb  is a village in Gdańsk County, Pomeranian Voivodeship, in northern Poland. It is the seat of the gmina (administrative district) called Gmina Suchy Dąb. 

The village has a population of 1,110.

References

Villages in Gdańsk County